Swatilekha Sengupta (née Chatterjee; 22 May 1950 – 16 June 2021) was a Bengali actress. She had received the Sangeet Natak Akademi Award for her contribution to Indian theatre as an actor.

Career
Swatilekha started her career in theater in Allahabad in the early 1970s, acting in productions under the direction of A.C. Banerjee. She also received guidance from B.V. Karanth, Tapas Sen, and Khaled Chowdhury. Then she moved to Kolkata and joined the theater group Nandikar in 1978. In Nandikar she worked under the direction of Rudraprasad Sengupta, whom she went on to marry.

She was also the lead female protagonist in Ghare Baire, a 1985 film by Satyajit Ray, against Victor Banerjee and Soumitra Chatterjee. This film was based upon a novel of the same name Ghare Baire written by the famous Bengali writer Rabindranath Tagore. She has also acted in films like Chauranga,Bela Seshe, Dharmajuddha and Bela Shuru.

Death
Sengupta died on 16 June 2021 from complications arising from kidney ailments. She was 71 at the time of her death. Her last work was Belashuru.

Filmography

Awards 
2011 – Sangeet Natak Akademi Award for her contribution to Indian theatre as an actor.
West Bengal Film Journalists' Association Awards.
Paschim Banga Natya Akademi award.

References

External links

1950 births
2021 deaths
Recipients of the Sangeet Natak Akademi Award
Bengali theatre personalities
Indian stage actresses
Actresses from Allahabad